Vesyolaya Lopan is a rural locality (a selo) and the administrative center of Vesyololopansky Rural Settlement, Belgorodsky District, Belgorod Oblast, Russia. The population was 2,696 as of 2010. There are 40 streets.

Geography 
Vesyolaya Lopan is located 8 km southwest of Maysky (the district's administrative centre) by road. Dolbino is the nearest rural locality.

References 

Rural localities in Belgorodsky District